Rémi Joseph Gustave Sainte-Marie (11 January 1938 – 18 June 2022) was a Canadian Roman Catholic prelate.

Sainte-Marie was born in Canada and was ordained to the priesthood in 1963. He served as auxiliary bishop and bishop of the Roman Catholic Diocese of Dedza, Malawi, from 1998 to 2006 and was the archbishop and bishop of the Roman Catholic Archdiocese of Lilongwe, Malawi, from 2006 until his retirement in 2013.

References

1938 births
2022 deaths
French Quebecers
Canadian Roman Catholic archbishops
Bishops appointed by Pope John Paul II
Bishops appointed by Pope Benedict XVI
White Fathers priests
People from Laurentides